Gustavius A. "Gus" Welch (December 18, 1892 – January 29, 1970) was an American football player, track and field athlete, coach of football and lacrosse, and college athletics administrator.

Early life
Welch was a full-blood Chippewa born in Spooner, Wisconsin. He attended the Carlisle Indian School, located in Carlisle, Pennsylvania and graduated in 1911. Gus was one of Carlisle's first honor students. While at Carlisle, Welch was the quarterback for the school’s football team, which featured Jim Thorpe and was coached by Pop Warner. He was a member of the USA Track and Field team during the 1912 Summer Olympics, although an illness prevented him from competing. After 1912, Welch played professional football for the Canton Bulldogs, coached by Thorpe. In 1917, Welch graduated from the Dickinson School of Law.

Military
In 1917, he entered the American Expeditionary Force during World War I as a Second Lieutenant, 808th Pioneer Infantry, under John J. Pershing. During his time in the military he achieved the rank of captain. He left the service in 1919.

Coaching career
From 1923 to 1929, Welch was the athletic director and head football coach at Randolph Macon College. From 1930 to 1934, he served as the head lacrosse coach at the University of Virginia. From 1935 until 1937, Welch served as the director of athletics and head football coach at Haskell Indian Nations University, located in Lawrence, Kansas. Afterwards he served as the head coach at Georgetown Prep School.  From 1937 to 1938, he served as head football coach at American University where he compiled an overall record of two wins, ten losses and one tie.

During World War II he was in charge of Physical Fitness at Georgetown University; and by 1947 taught physical education at Lyndon Hill Junior High School, located in Prince George County, Virginia.

Camps
In 1929, Welch purchased a boy's camp near the Peaks of the Otter in Bedford County, Virginia, which he operated during the next 30 summers as Camp Kewanzee for young people. In 1939, some of his land was condemned by the US Department of the Interior to extend the Blue Ridge Parkway, a seizure Welch fought vigorously. He then purchased a farm near Bedford, Virginia, and continued to work with young athletes. Gus finally served as athletic director at American University in Washington, D.C. prior to his 1970 death.

Honors
In 1973, Welch was named to the American Indian Athletic Hall of Fame and in 1975 to National Football Foundation's College Football Hall of Fame.  In the late 1960s, Welch's help was sought by both the Jim Thorpe Project of Carlisle, Pennsylvania, and the Jim Thorpe Athletic Award Committee of Yale, Oklahoma.

Family
In 1923, Welch married Julia Carter, daughter of Charles David Carter, Oklahoma Congressman from Boggy Depot. A Chickasaw, Carter descended from David Carter, a white man captured in Connecticut and raised as an Indian who elected to remain with them as an adult, married an Indian woman, and for a time edited The Phoenix, an Indian newspaper. The Welchs had no children but adopted a niece, Serena, who became the model for the figure portrayed on the canning labels of Pocahontas Foods.

Carter's family was also close to Vinnie Ream, after whom Vinita, Oklahoma is named. Ream became a sculptor of several statues in Washington, D.C., including one of Abraham Lincoln placed in the United States Capitol rotunda.

Death
Welch died on January 29, 1970, of a heart attack, at Bedford Memorial Hospital in Bedford, Virginia.

Head coaching record

Football

References

External links
 
 Gus Welch papers, 1911-1979, Department of Special Collections and University Archives, McFarlin Library, The University of Tulsa

1892 births
1970 deaths
American football quarterbacks
American Eagles athletic directors
American Eagles football coaches
Carlisle Indians football players
Carlisle Indians football coaches
Canton Bulldogs (Ohio League) players
Canton Professionals players
Dickinson Red Devils football players
Haskell Indian Nations Fighting Indians athletic directors
Haskell Indian Nations Fighting Indians football coaches
Randolph–Macon Yellow Jackets athletic directors
Randolph–Macon Yellow Jackets football coaches
Virginia Cavaliers football coaches
Virginia Cavaliers men's lacrosse coaches
Washington State Cougars football coaches
College Football Hall of Fame inductees
United States Army personnel of World War I
United States Army officers
People from Spooner, Wisconsin
Players of American football from Wisconsin
Native American sportspeople
Ojibwe people
Native American United States military personnel
Military personnel from Wisconsin